Thorius magnipes is a species of salamander in the family Plethodontidae. It is endemic to the   Sierra Madre de Oaxaca of Mexico, and only known from near its type locality near Acultzingo, Veracruz. Its natural habitat is pine-oak forest. It can be found in bromeliads, leaf axils, under rocks and leaf-litter, and inside piles of wood chips. It is threatened by habitat loss caused by logging and agriculture.

References

Thorius
Endemic amphibians of Mexico
Fauna of the Sierra Madre de Oaxaca
Taxonomy articles created by Polbot
Amphibians described in 1998